Endre Bajúsz (Serbian: Ендре Бајус, Endre Bajus) (born 21 October 1976) is a Serbian-born Hungarian football defender playing with AFK Ada.

Previously he played with Serbian top league club FK Vojvodina before moving to Hungary where he played for Győri ETO FC, MTE-Motim, Szolnoki MÁV, Pécsi Mecsek FC and MTK Hungária FC.  In summer 2010 he moved back to Serbia joining FK Senta in the Serbian League Vojvodina.

External links
 Player profile at Nemzeti Sport 
 Player profile at HLSZ 
 Profile at Srbijafudbal
 Player page at FK Senta official website

Living people
1976 births
People from Senta
Hungarians in Vojvodina
Hungarian people of Serbian descent
Hungarian footballers
Hungarian expatriate footballers
Serbian footballers
RFK Novi Sad 1921 players
FK Vojvodina players
Hungarian expatriate sportspeople in Serbia
Győri ETO FC players
Mosonmagyaróvári TE 1904 footballers
Szolnoki MÁV FC footballers
Pécsi MFC players
MTK Budapest FC players
Association football defenders
Serbian expatriate sportspeople in Hungary
Serbian expatriate footballers